The Zenith STOL CH 701 and CH 750 are a family of light, two-place kit-built STOL aircraft designed by Canadian aeronautical engineer Chris Heintz through his Midland, Ontario based company, Zenair. The CH 701 first flew in 1986 and the design is still in production. The CH 750 was first introduced in 2008. The CH 701 was later developed into the four-place Zenith STOL CH 801.

The kit is produced and distributed in the US by the Zenith Aircraft Company of Mexico, Missouri, and complete drawings, including blueprints and manuals, are also available for the design. In Europe, the CH 701 was manufactured under license by Czech Aircraft Works (CZAW) from 1992 until 2006, when the license agreement was ended.

Design and development
Designed for off-runway operations, the all-metal CH 701 has many features that contribute to the aircraft's capabilities, such as a high-lift wing with full-span, non-movable leading edge slots, an all-flying rudder, large tires, flaperons and an inverted elevator. Heintz also designed a unique tricycle gear amphibious float system for the CH 701.

Standard engines used are the  Rotax 582 two-stroke, the  Rotax 912UL, the  Rotax 912ULS and the  Jabiru 2200 four-stroke powerplants. The aircraft has also been equipped with the JLT Motors Ecoyota engine.

The STOL CH 701 has the unique distinction of being what is probably the most copied light aircraft in production today. Several dozen unauthorized versions have been produced around the world.

Designed to the Light Aircraft Manufacturers Association of Canada (LAMAC) design standard DS 10141, in its native country of Canada the CH 701 can be built and flown as a basic ultralight, advanced ultralight or amateur-built. The CH 701 can be flown under microlight or ultralight rules in several other countries also. American pilots may fly the CH 701 under Light-sport Aircraft rules or as an experimental amateur-built. The CH 750 is designed to comply with the US Light sport aircraft rules.

Operational history
By the fall of 2007, 750 CH 701s had been completed and were flying. In July 2014, representatives of the company gathered volunteers of the EAA Airventure airshow to build a CH-750 kit in a one-week timeframe.

Variants
STOL CH 701 
Original version
STOL CH 701SP
Comes with two standard  wing tanks, solid aluminum spring gear. Smaller refinements to achieve a gross weight of 1100 lbs (500 kg).
STOL CH 750
Introduced at AirVenture 2008, the STOL CH 750 has an enlarged cabin with wider doors and is optimized for US Light Sport Aircraft rules with a maximum takeoff weight of 1320 lbs (600 kg). Builders may also opt to register it for operation on water at 1430 lbs (650 kg) while remaining within the LSA limits, or as an experimental amateur-built aircraft up to 1440 lbs (655 kg.) The STOL CH 750 was also to be factory-built by AMD as a Special Light Sport Aircraft but as of 2014 is listed by the FAA as no longer produced as an SLSA.

CH 750 Cruzer
Introduced at Sun 'n Fun 2013, the CH-750 Cruzer uses a new wing without the leading-edge slats of the STOL CH 750, and a newly designed tail with a separate vertical fin and rudder, rather than the all-flying rudder of the STOL version. The model is optimized for cross-country speed rather than STOL capabilities, although the specified 350 ft (107 m) ground roll of the Cruzer qualifies as STOL by most definitions. It mounts wheel pants as standard (although these may be removed and larger wheels installed) and the prototype is powered by a  ULPower UL350is fuel injected engine, although other engines in the  range can be used.
STOL CH750 Super Duty
This model introduced greater carrying capacity and climb capabilities.
Nuncats Sky jeep
 Electric-powered derivative of CH 750, that was first flown in January 2023.

Operators

Indian Air Force - ordered 85 aircraft, with options for a further 48 for use by the National Cadet Corps with 25 in service by February 2001.

Specifications (CH 701)

See also
ICP Savannah
Tapanee Pegazair-100
Zenith STOL CH 801

References

Notes

Bibliography

 "Airscene: Aero India." Air International, Volume 60, Issue 4, April 2001. .
 Batchelor, Tom. "The electric sky jeep". Air International, Vol. 101, No. 1, July 2021. pp. 62–66. .
 Bayerl, Robby, Martin Berkemeier, et al. World Directory of Leisure Aviation 2011-12. Lancaster UK: WDLA UK, 2011. .
 Kitplanes Staff. "2008 Kit Aircraft Directory." Kitplanes, Volume 24, Number 12, December 2007. .
 Lambert, Mark, ed. Jane's All The World's Aircraft 1993-94. Coulsdon, UK: Jane's Data Division, 1993. .
 Tacke, Willi, Marino Boric, et al. "World Directory of Light Aviation 2015-16." Flying Pages Europe SARL, 2015. .
 Vandermeullen, Richard: "2011 Kit Aircraft Buyer's Guide." Kitplanes, Volume 28, Number 12, December 2011.

External links
 

1980s Canadian ultralight aircraft
Light-sport aircraft
CH 701
CH 701
High-wing aircraft
Single-engined tractor aircraft
STOL aircraft
Aircraft first flown in 1986